Alexandra Dinges-Dierig (born 17 February 1953) is a former German politician from the Christian Democratic Union who served as a member of the Hamburg Parliament and the Bundestag.

References

See also 

 List of members of the 18th Bundestag

1953 births
Living people
University of Freiburg alumni
Members of the Hamburg Parliament

Members of the Bundestag for Schleswig-Holstein
Members of the Bundestag 2013–2017
21st-century German women politicians
21st-century German politicians
Members of the Bundestag for the Christian Democratic Union of Germany
Female members of the Bundestag